Hybomitra aterrima is a species of horse flies in the family Tabanidae.

Distribution
This species can be found in most of Europe (Austria, Bosnia, Croatia, France, Germany, Greece, Italy, Republic of Macedonia, Romania, Spain and Switzerland).

Description

The body is black and the wings are transparent, with a small dark patch at the base of the vein R4.

Face is black haired, with high antennal bows. Palpi are blackish with black hairs. The compound eyes are well-developed in both sexes. They have an iridescent light green pigmentation,  with three blue-reddish transversal bands.

The Hybomitra aterrima var. auripila (Meigen) has the abdominal tergites more or less distinctly golden-yellow pubescent on posterior margins.

Biology
Males of these horse flies feed on plant juices, while female are bloodsuckers, feeding mainly on mammalian blood, as they require a blood meal before they are able to reproduce. They  may be very annoying for cattle, but usually they do not bite people.

References

External links
 
 
 Diptera.info
 Cor Zonneveld Natural History Photographs
 Biodiversidad Virtual

Tabanidae
Diptera of Europe
Insects described in 1820
Taxa named by Johann Wilhelm Meigen